This is a list of Lutheran churches that are notable either as congregations or as buildings.

Canada 
 First Lutheran Church (Vancouver)
 Redeemer Lutheran Church (Victoria, British Columbia)
 Trinity Evangelical Lutheran Church (Toronto)
 Emmanuel Lutheran Church (R M Lumsden, Saskatchewan)

England 
 St Anne and St Agnes, London
 St George's German Lutheran Church, London
 Savoy Chapel, London
 Nordic churches in London, London
 German Protestant Church, Greenheys, now Stephen Joseph Studio

Estonia 

 Charles's Church, Tallinn
 Church of the Holy Spirit, Tallinn
 St. John's Church, Tartu
 St. Michael's Church, Tallinn
 St. Nicholas Church, Tallinn
 St. Olaf's Church, Tallinn
 Valjala Church, oldest church in Estonia

Finland 
 Helsinki Cathedral
 Espoo Cathedral
 Joensuu Church
 Kallio Church, Helsinki
 Kerimäki Church
 Kuopio Cathedral
 Lapua Cathedral
 Mikkeli Cathedral
 Oulu Cathedral
 Porvoo Cathedral
 Suomenlinna Church, Helsinki (originally an Eastern Orthodox church, converted to a Lutheran church in 1918)
 Tampere Cathedral
 Temppeliaukio Church, Helsinki
 Turku Cathedral

France 
 Saint Nicholas Church, Strasbourg
 Saint William's Church, Strasbourg
 St. Paul's Church (Strasbourg)
 Saint-Pierre-le-Jeune Protestant Church
 Temple Neuf

Germany 
 St. Anne's Church, Annaberg-Buchholz
 Bach Church, Arnstadt
 St. Anne's Church, Augsburg
 St. Lambert's Church, Bergen
 Capernaum Church
 Gethsemane Church
 St. Mary's Church, Berlin
 St. Nicholas' Church, Berlin
 St. Peter and St. Paul's Church, Detwang
 Anne's Church, Dresden
 Frauenkirche, Dresden
 Kreuzkirche, Dresden
 Sophienkirche, Dresden
 Zionskirche, Dresden
 St Andrew's Church, Erfurt
 St Michael's Church, Erfurt
 Kaufmannskirche, Erfurt
 Reglerkirche, Erfurt
 St. Catherine's Church, Frankfurt
 St. Paul's Church, Frankfurt am Main
 Gandersheim Abbey
 St. Martin's Church, Groß Ellershausen
 Gustav Adolf Stave Church
 St. Catherine's Church, Hamburg
 St. James' Church, Hamburg
 St. Mary's Church, Fuhlsbüttel, Hamburg
 St. Matthew's Church, Hamburg
 St. Nicholas' Church, Hamburg
 St. Peter's Church, Hamburg
 Neustädter Kirche, Hannover
 St. Kilian's Church, Heilbronn
 St. Andrew's Church, Hildesheim
 Zum Friedefürsten Church
 Limbach Municipal Church
 St. Catherine's Church, Lübeck
 St. Mary's Church, Lübeck
 St. John's Church, Lüneburg
 St. Mary's Church, Marienberg
 Mariental Abbey
 Merseburg Cathedral
 Divi Blasii, Mühlhausen
 St. Mary's Church, Mühlhausen
 St. Luke's Church, Munich
 St. Lorenz, Nuremberg
 St. Sebaldus Church, Nuremberg
 St. Mary's Church, Reutlingen
 St. Mary's Church, Rostock
 St. Peter's Church, Rostock
 St. James's Church, Rothenburg ob der Tauber
 Schelf Church
 St. Wolfgang's Church, Schneeberg
 Church of Saints Cosmas and Damian, Stade
 St. Mary's Church, Stralsund
 Church of St. Fabian and St. Sebastian, Sülze
 St. Bartholomew's Church, Themar
 St. George's Collegiate Church, Tübingen
 Ulm Minster
 Warnemünde Church
 All Saints' Church, Wittenberg
 Stadtkirche Wittenberg
 Zion's Church, Worpswede

Iceland
Akureyrarkirkja
Hallgrímskirkja, Reykjavik

Israel
 Church of the Redeemer, Jerusalem

Latvia
 Riga Cathedral
 Holy Trinity Cathedral, Liepāja
 Martin Luther Cathedral, Daugavpils

Norway
Arctic Cathedral, Tromsø 
Heddal Stave Church
Nidaros Cathedral, Trondheim
Tromsø Cathedral

Poland 
 Vang Stave Church, built around 1200, moved from Norway in 1842
 Holy Trinity Church, Warsaw
 St. Matthew's Church, Łódź
 Lutheran Church in Lublin
 Church of Peace in Świdnica
 Church of Peace in Jawor
 Church of St. Peter and St. Paul, Pabianice

Russia 
 The Lutheran Church of the Holy Catherine, Omsk
 Lutheran Church of Saint Michael, Saint Petersburg

South Georgia

Sweden 
Karesuando Church
Kiruna Church
Luleå Cathedral
Storkyrkan, Stockholm
Uppsala Cathedral

United States 
There are numerous Lutheran church buildings in the U.S. that are listed on the National Register of Historic Places or that are otherwise notable.

Former Lutheran churches in China 
 Holy Cross Church, Chongqing
 Lutheran Church, Dalian
 German Lutheran Church, Harbin

References 

Lists of churches
Churches